Noor Imran Mithu is a Bangladeshi film actor and director.

Biography
Noor Imran Mithu made his debut in silver screen with Ant Story in 2014. For this film he was nominated for Meril Prothom Alo Awards 2014 in Best Debut Actor/Actress category. He directed two dramas for Channel I in 2016. In 2018 he made his debut as a film director with Komola Rocket. He was awarded in Jaffna International Cinema Festival in Sri Lanka as Best Debut Director and nominated for Meril Prothom Alo Awards in 2019 for this film.

Filmography

Actor

Director

Awards and nominations

References

External links
 

Bangladeshi male film actors
Bangladeshi film directors
Living people
Khulna University alumni
Year of birth missing (living people)